Gela Nash-Taylor (née Jacobson, born 1953) is an American fashion designer and former actress. She co-founded the American brand Juicy Couture in 1997 with Pamela Skaist-Levy. In 2021, she co-founded Los Angeles-based apparel and cannabis brand, Potent Goods, with her son Travis.

Early life
She graduated from Carnegie Mellon University in 1978 as a drama major.

Personal life
She has been married to the musician John Taylor, bass guitarist in the pop group Duran Duran, since 1999. They live in Los Angeles, and at South Wraxall Manor, Wiltshire, England.

References

External links
 

American fashion designers
American television actresses
Living people
Carnegie Mellon University alumni
1953 births
American women fashion designers